Kunjattakilikal is a 1986 Indian Malayalam-language family drama film directed by J. Sasikumar and written by S. L. Puram Sadanandan. The film stars Mohanlal, Shobhana, M. G. Soman and Sukumari. The film features songs composed by A. J. Joseph and background score by Johnson.

Plot
Balakrishnan becomes the guardian of his brother Ramachandran's children after his demise. Over time, he falls in love with the children's tutor, Usha, but her greedy parents are against their union.

Cast
Mohanlal as Balakrishnan 
Shobhana as Usha 
M. G. Soman as Vishwanatha Menon 
Sukumari as Kamalamma 
Mala Aravindan as Panikkar 
Thilakan as Ayyappan Nair 
V. D. Rajappan as Dasappan 
Meena as Bhageerathi 
Alummoodan as Discipline d'Cruz
Thodupuzha Vasanthi as Madhavi

Soundtrack
The music was composed by A. J. Joseph and the lyrics were written by K. Jayakumar.

Release

References

External links
  
 

1986 films
1980s Malayalam-language films
Indian family films
Indian drama films
Films directed by J. Sasikumar